Wolfgang Seifen (born 1956, in Bergheim) is a German organist and composer.

Seifen studied church music at the Gregoriushaus in Aachen. From 1973 to 1976 he was church musician in St Sebastian in Nettetal-Lobberich. In 1983 he became organist at the Marienbasilica in Kevelaer and in 2004 he was appointed the organist of the Kaiser Wilhelm Memorial Church in Berlin.

From 1989 to 1992 he taught organ at the Staatliche Hochschule für Musik und Darstellende Kunst in Stuttgart and from 1992 to 2000 at the Robert Schumann Hochschule in Düsseldorf. In 2000 he was appointed professor of improvisation at the Universität der Künste in Berlin.

Compositions
 Missa Solemnis "Tu es Petrus"
 Johannes-Passion for choir and soloists
 Missa Solemnis for choir and organ
 Messe in G
 Triptyque Symphonique
 Konzert für Orgel und Orchester
 Drei Stücke für Orgel
 Choralvorspiele für Orgel
 Charakterstücke für Orgel (Strube-Verlag)
 Konzertstück für Orgel
 Fantaisie Populaire
 Messe du Mariage für Orgel

References

External links
 Homepage

1956 births
Living people
German classical organists
German male organists
Organ improvisers
Musicians from Berlin
Robert Schumann Hochschule alumni
21st-century organists
21st-century German male musicians
Male classical organists